The 2010–11 UIC Flames men's basketball team represented the University of Illinois at Chicago in the 2010–11 NCAA Division I men's basketball season. Their head coach was Howard Moore, serving his first year. The Flames played their home games at the UIC Pavilion and were members of the Horizon League. They finished the season 7–24, 2–16 in Horizon League play and lost in the first round of the 2011 Horizon League men's basketball tournament to Cleveland State.

Roster

Schedule

|-
!colspan=9| Exhibition

|-
!colspan=9| Regular season

|-
!colspan=9| Horizon League tournament

References

UIC Flames
UIC Flames men's basketball seasons
UIC Flames men's basketball
2010 in sports in Illinois